Davide Carta (born 15 June 1972) is an Italian speed skater. He competed at the 1994 Winter Olympics, the 1998 Winter Olympics and the 2002 Winter Olympics.

References

External links
 

1972 births
Living people
Italian male speed skaters
Olympic speed skaters of Italy
Speed skaters at the 1994 Winter Olympics
Speed skaters at the 1998 Winter Olympics
Speed skaters at the 2002 Winter Olympics
Sportspeople from Turin